SWML may refer to:

South Wales Main Line
South West Main Line